The Peaceful Side is an album by pianist and composer Billy Strayhorn recorded in Paris in 1961 and originally released on United Artists Jazz in 1963, then reissued by Solid State in 1968 as The Peaceful Side of Billy Strayhorn.

Reception

The AllMusic review by Scott Yanow stated: "This is a little-known and rather melancholy set, virtually Billy Strayhorn's only recording away from the world of Duke Ellington. The focus is totally on Strayhorn's piano throughout his interpretations of ten of his compositions... Strayhorn's melodic and concise playing is quite somber, peaceful in volume but filled with inner tension". On All About Jazz, Joel Roberts noted "This is a quiet, spare recording featuring just Strayhorn's piano with occasional accompaniment by bass, string quartet, or vocal chorus. Strayhorn brings out all the passion and melancholy of his own compositions, which are performed in much more relaxed tempos than we are used to hearing. ...It is a shame that Strayhorn did not record more, since he brought the same extraordinary musical intelligence and sophistication to his piano playing that he did to his composing".

Track listing 
All compositions by Billy Strayhorn except as indicated
 "Lush Life" - 3:25 (feat. Paris Blue Notes)
 "Just A-Sittin' and A-Rockin'" (Duke Ellington, Billy Strayhorn, Lee Gaines) - 2:49 (feat. Michel Goudret)
 "Passion Flower" (Billy Strayhorn, Milton Raskin (lyrics)) - 3:40 (feat. Michel Goudret)	
 "Take the "A" Train" - 3:14 (feat. Paris String Quartet)
 "Strange Feeling" (Ellington, Strayhorn) - 3:38
 "Day Dream" (Ellington, Strayhorn, John La Touche) - 4:01 (feat. Paris Blue Notes)
 "Chelsea Bridge" - 3:15
 "Multi-Colored Blue" - 3:19 (feat. Paris Blue Notes, Michel Goudret)
 "Something to Live For" (Ellington, Strayhorn) - 2:59 (feat. Michel Goudret)
 "A Flower Is a Lovesome Thing" - 4:43 (feat. Paris String Quartet, Michel Goudret)

Personnel 
Billy Strayhorn - piano
Michel Goudret - bass on 2,3,8,9,10
Paris Blue Notes - vocal choir on 1,6,8
Paris String Quartet - strings 4,10

References 

Billy Strayhorn albums
1963 albums
United Artists Records albums
Solid State Records (jazz label) albums